The Fokker S.14 Machtrainer is a two-seater military training jet aircraft designed and manufactured by the Dutch aircraft manufacturer Fokker for the Royal Netherlands Air Force (RNLAF). It has the distinction of being one of the first dedicated jet-powered training aircraft to be produced in the world.

Development started in the late 1940s at the behest of British engine manufacturer Rolls-Royce, who were seeking out a manufacturer to produce a new trainer aircraft powered by their Derwent turbojet engine. Fokker decided to design such an aircraft, designating it the S.14 Machtrainer. On 19 May 1951, the first prototype performed the type's maiden flight. Having secured an order from the RNLAF for 20 aircraft, the Machtrainer entered service with the service during 1955. It would be operated by the service until the last examples were retired in 1967.

Fokker initially had high sales hopes for the Machtrainer on the global trainer market, which included its manufacture under license overseas. American aircraft manufacturer Fairchild was interested in producing the Machtrainer for the United States Air Force, but failed to secure any orders itself. Brazil also negotiated for the local manufacture of 50 Rolls-Royce Nene-powered Machtrainers, but political changes derailed this effort as well. Various countries studied its adoption, however, the Machtrainer would ultimately not be adopted by any organisation other than the RNLAF.

Development

Origins

Following the end of the Second World War, the nations of Europe began to recover and rebuild their national industries, Dutch aircraft manufacturer Fokker was no exception. While initial activities revolved around the refurbishment and building of foreign-designed aircraft, such as the Hawker Sea Fury and Gloster Meteor, figures within the Dutch government and Fokker itself were keen to resume its own indigenous design activities as well. In particular, there was considerable interest in Fokker developing aircraft that would harness the newly-available field of jet propulsion.

Likely having recognised that the increasing prevalence of jet-powered fighters would soon lead to existing piston-engined advanced trainers not possessing comparable performance, during the late 1940s, Fokker commenced work on designing their own jet-engined advanced trainer, designated S.14 Machtrainer. In 1949, aviation periodical Flight International observed the company's specification to have been "unique... a turbojet-powered advanced trainer, offering side-by-side seating of pupil and instructor, simplicity in maintenance and construction and an adequate all-round performance".

According to aviation author Roland W. Harker, the notion of producing a Dutch jet trainer had originated from a speculative approach by British engine manufacturer Rolls-Royce to Fokker with drawings for a Derwent-powered jet trainer. Allegedly, Rolls-Royce had feared losing out on engine sales upon the large and lucrative market for jet trainers, particularly to the Goblin-powered de Havilland Vampire; the company had previously been rebuffed after attempting to raise interest with British manufacturer Miles Aircraft in producing a Derwent-powered competitor, and thus decided to approach Fokker.

Into flight
On 19 May 1951, the first prototype, registered PH-NDY, conducted its maiden flight; it was powered by a single Derwent V engine. However, it received considerable damage later that day as a result of the undercarriage having failed to extend during its second flight. The prototype was fully repaired and was subsequently displayed at the Paris Air Show later that year. While the prototype and the production aircraft that followed it were largely similar, portions of the airframe were strengthened to cope with greater G-forces.

The Royal Netherlands Air Force placed an order for 20 S.14s equipped with the more powerful Rolls-Royce Derwent 8 engine. At one point, Fokker held great hopes for the Machtrainer's export prospects; the company held negotiations with Brazil on the topic of manufacturing 50 Rolls-Royce Nene-powered Machtrainers under licence. In addition, the American aircraft manufacturer Fairchild, which later also built the Fokker Friendship under license, sought to secure an order for the Machtrainer from the United States Air Force.

To support the company's sales efforts, the first prototype was reengined with the Nene III powerplant, which was capable of producing up to  thrust; it first flew in this configuration on 25 October 1953. However, the Brazilian initiative ultimately came to naught, interest having evaporated following a change of government in Brazil. Fairchild also chose to abandon its production plans for the type. Although several other countries also tested the aircraft, orders did not materialize. Compared to other dedicated jet trainer designs of the same period such as the Fouga Magister, the Machtrainer possessed higher operational costs.

Design

The S.14 Machtrainer was a low-winged monoplane. Featuring all-metal construction, aside from the engine compartment, it was almost exclusively composed of lightweight alloys. To accommodate a sizable cockpit, it possessed a fairly wide fuselage. The design and size of the wing reportedly allowed for the aircraft to land at much lower speeds than contemporary jet aircraft. A total of three pneumatically-actuated door-type air brakes were fitted to the rear fuselage. It was also provisioned with a retractable tricycle undercarriage, which was also pneumatically-operated; the main wheels were fitted with Dowty-built shock absorbers. The main assemblies of the undercarriage retracted inwards into the wing's centre section, while the nosewheel retracted forwards into a recess under the nose.

In order to better facilitate its use as a trainer, the crew of two were seated in a side-by-side arrangement within a relatively spacious cockpit. There was actually enough room for a third crew member, although this capability would necessitate the deletion of the radio or radar equipment that could otherwise be installed in this location. Primary controls, such as the throttle and air brakes, were duplicated; many of the controls were positioned on a central pedestal. Both aircrew were provided with Martin-Baker-built Mk.2FK ejection seats. The slide hood of the canopy was jettisonable and operated electrically. The majority of the aircraft's electrical systems were installed directly beneath the cockpit and were accessible via multiple inspection panels; consumables such as batteries and oxygen canisters were also housed nearby.

The S.14 was powered by a single Rolls-Royce Derwent engine, accommodated in the centre of the fuselage, directly above the low-mounted wing and surrounded by steel walls, and separated from the cockpit by a fireproof bulkhead. Air was supplied to the engine via two ducts that diverged sharply from a central circular inlet present in the nose of the aircraft. A lengthy jetpipe, carried upon trunnions, was also used; it could be released and readily moved for maintenance inspections. Fuel tanks were housed within the central and outer sections of the wing; electrical booster pumps transferred fuel between the engine and the inner tanks, while air pressure alone was sufficient to move fuel from the outer tanks. The wing's centre sections were individually bolted onto the lower fuselage; the wing itself was tapered, covered in alclad, and featured split-flaps along the centre of its trailing edge.

Operational history

During October 1955, the Machtrainer entered service with the Royal Netherlands Air Force; deliveries of the type continued until November 1956. Only 19 of the 20 aircraft ordered by the RNLAF entered service, one being destroyed in a fatal crash in the United States while being used by Fokker as a demonstrator prior to delivery. The S.14 fleet was in use for over a decade, during which a second aircraft was lost in a fatal crash in 1964.

Of the original production run, two aircraft were lost in accidents; the remainder were scrapped in the years following their withdrawal during the late 1960s. Three still exist today including the original prototype (K-1, PH-XIV), which was operated by the Nationaal Luchtvaartlaboratorium (NLL), located at Amsterdam Airport Schiphol, until retirement in March 1966. It was then displayed at the Aviodome museum at Schiphol before moving to the new Aviodrome museum at Lelystad Airport by 2003.

The production aircraft L-11 is preserved at the Dutch National Military Museum at the former Soesterberg Air Base. L-17 is undergoing renovation. There was a fourth, L-18, which was positioned besides one of the entrances at Fokker facility at Ypenburg, but this aircraft was scrapped during 1994 at the same time as the site was being closed down.

Operators

 Royal Netherlands Air Force

Variants
S.14 Machtrainer The main production variant powered by the Rolls-Royce Derwent 8 turbojet; 21 built.

S.14 Machtrainer II The variant intended for export powered by the Rolls-Royce Nene III turbojet; 1 built.

Specifications

See also

References

Notes

Citations

Bibliography

 Dekker, Herman. The Complete Civil Aircraft Registers of the Netherlands since 1920. Air-Britain (Historians) Ltd. 1987. .
 Donald, David. The Encyclopedia of World Aircraft. Leicester, UK: Blitz Editions, 1997. .
 "Holland's Jet Trainer." Flight, 24 November 1949, pp. 687–688.
 Harker, Ronald W. "Rolls-Royce From the Wings 1925-1971." Oxford Illustrated Press, 1976. .
 Hooftman, Hugo. "Van Brik tot Starfighter, Part 2." de schietstoel, the Netherlands: La Rivière & Voorhoev, 1962.
 Marchand, Arno. "‘De Plank." De Vliegende Hollander, January 2007, pp. 10–11.
 Schoenmaker, Wim. "De Fokker S-14 Machtrainer." Maandblad Luchtvaart No. 6, June 1988, pp. 182–187.
 Sipkes, Lt. Col. C. et al. "Ervaringen van de Koninklijke Luchtmacht met de Fokker-vliegtuigen S-11 en S-14." Report Koninklijke Luchtmacht, 20 November 1958.
 Smith, Maurice A. "Fokker S.14 in the Air." Flight, 15 January 1954, pp. 68–72.
 Uijthoven, René L. "Twenty-One Worldbeaters:Fokker's S.14 Machtrainer". Air Enthusiast, No. 103, January/February 2003, pp. 52–57. Stamford, UK: Key Publishing. ISSN 0143-5450.

External links

 LetLetLet Fokker S.14 article published June 2008
 Data at scramble.nl Wiki
 Rolls-Royce Derwent 8 picture
 Rolls-Royce Derwent 8 specifications
 Gallery of a photo walk around of museum S14
 Gallery of preserved S.14 at aviation museums
 Aviodome S.14 prototype images
 Gallery of various S.14 outside

1950s Dutch military trainer aircraft
S14 Machtrainer
Low-wing aircraft
Single-engined jet aircraft
Aircraft first flown in 1951